Aïn Choucha is a village in the commune of Sidi Amrane, in Djamaâ District, El Oued Province, Algeria.

References

Neighbouring towns and cities

Populated places in El Oued Province